Oberto Airaudi (29 May 1950 – 24 June 2013) was an Italian philosopher and artist, who founded the Federation of Damanhur. Airaudi also went by the name of Falco (Hawk), based on the Damanhur practice of adopting animal names. He was born in Balangero, near Turin, Italy.

In 1975, Airaudi and a group of about 25 other people founded the Federation of Damanhur, a New Age commune and eco-village. Beginning in 1978, Airaudi directed construction of the underground facility the Temples of Humankind. Initially in secret, the Temples became public knowledge in 1992, when a former member sued to regain his possessions from the group. Prior to founding the community, he had worked as an insurance agent.

Airaudi died of liver cancer.

References

Sources

Publications
 Dying to Learn: First Book of the Initiate. Oberto Airaudi with a Foreword by Laura M. George (Revised English Ed. 2012). The Oracle Institute: 
 Reborn to Live: Second Book of the Initiate. Oberto Airaudi with a Foreword by Alex Grey (Revised English Ed. 2013). The Oracle Institute: .
 Seven Scarlet Doors: Third Book of the Initiate. Oberto Airaudi with a Foreword by Barbara Marx Hubbard (Revised English Ed. 2013). The Oracle Institute: 
 Bral Talej: Divination Cards. Oberto Airaudi and Shama Viola (2011). The Oracle Institute: UPC 8032937910017

External links
 Federation of Damanhur – official website

1950 births
2013 deaths
Italian philosophers
Italian male writers
20th-century Italian painters
Italian male painters
21st-century Italian painters
20th-century Italian male artists
21st-century Italian male artists